Joachim Hauer (born 2 February 1991) is a Norwegian ski jumper.

Hauer made his World Cup debut in January 2014. His best individual result is a 3rd place, won in Nizhny Tagil in December 2015.

He hails from Oslo and represents the club Bækkelagets SK.

References

1991 births
Living people
Skiers from Oslo
Norwegian male ski jumpers
21st-century Norwegian people